Bradley Svend Wilson (born 10 April 1985) is a former cricketer. He played for New Zealand in the Under-19 Cricket World Cup in 2004. In 2004–05 he was selected to play first-class cricket for Northern Districts and made 96 against Otago on his first-class debut. His later innings have, however, were disappointing, but he was retained by Northern Districts for the 2005–06 season. Wilson also played for Northland in the Hawke Cup. He was born in Auckland.

Wilson captained Northern Districts to victory in the 2011-12 Plunket Shield season. In June 2018, he was awarded a contract with Otago for the 2018–19 season.

References

External links

1985 births
Living people
New Zealand cricketers
Northern Districts cricketers
Otago cricketers